The Eye, also known as Seeing Ghosts, is a 2002 Hong Kong-Singaporean horror film directed by the Pang brothers. The film spawned two sequels by the Pang brothers, The Eye 2 and The Eye 10. There are three remakes of this film, including Adhu, made in 2004 in Tamil, Naina made in 2005 in Hindi and The Eye, a 2008 Hollywood production starring Jessica Alba.

Plot
Blind since the age of five, 20-year-old Hong Kong classical violinist Wong Kar Mun undergoes an eye cornea transplant after receiving a pair of new eyes from a donor. Initially, she is glad to have her sight restored but becomes troubled when she starts seeing mysterious figures that seem to foretell gruesome deaths. The night before her discharge from the hospital, she sees a shadowy figure accompanying a patient out of the room and the next morning the patient is pronounced dead.

Mun goes to see her doctor's nephew, Dr. Wah, a psychotherapist, about the strange entities that she has been seeing. He is skeptical at first, but as he gradually develops a closer relationship with her, he decides to accompany her on a trip to northern Thailand to find Ling, the eye donor. When they ask a village doctor about Ling and her family, he is unwilling to reveal anything but becomes more cooperative when Mun tells him that she sees what Ling used to see. Apparently, Ling had a psychic ability that allowed her to foresee death and disaster. However, her fellow villagers misunderstood her as a jinx and refused to trust her. Once, Ling tried to warn the people about an imminent disaster, but they drove her away in disbelief. When her vision came true, she felt guilty about the deaths and hanged herself. Ling's mother is both depressed and angry with her daughter and has never forgiven Ling for committing suicide, until one night Ling's spirit possesses Mun and attempts suicide. Ling's mother saves Mun and breaks down, saying that she has forgiven Ling and Ling's spirit leaves in peace.

On the return journey, their bus is caught in a traffic jam and Mun sees hundreds of ghostly figures lumbering on the road. Believing that a catastrophe is approaching, she runs out of the bus and tries to warn everyone to leave, but no one understands her and think that she is insane. In fact, the traffic jam is due to a tank truck that has toppled over and is blocking the road. The truck starts leaking natural gas but nobody notices it. A driver restarts his engine and ignites the gas, causing a chain explosion. Dr. Wah saves Mun from death by shielding her with his body, but Mun is already blinded by glass fragments. In the epilogue, a blind Mun is seen roaming the streets of Hong Kong. Although she has lost her sense of sight again, she is happy that she now has the support and friendship of Dr. Wah.

Cast
 Angelica Lee as Wong Kar Mun
 Cusnithorn Chotiphan as young Mun
 Lawrence Chou as Dr. Wah
 Chutcha Rujinanon as Chiu Wai-ling
 Tassanana Nuntasaree as Ling (4 years old)
 Damronowiseeatpanich as Ling (8 years old)
 So Yat-lai as Yingying
 Candy Lo as Yee (Mun's sister)
 Dampcingcingtrakulsawadee as young Yee
 Ko Yin-ping as Mun's grandmother
 Pierre Png as Dr Eak
 Edmund Chen as Dr Lo

Production
The Eye is a co-production of MediaCorp Raintree Pictures in Singapore and Applause Pictures of Hong Kong, and was shot in Hong Kong and Thailand with a pan-Asian cast and crew, including Malaysian actress Angelica Lee, Chinese-Canadian singer Lawrence Chou, Singaporean singer-actor Pierre Png and Thai actress Chutcha Rujinanon. The crew included Thai cinematographer Decha Seementa and the Thai music collective Orange Music provided the score.

Danny and Oxide Pang said they were inspired to write the screenplay for The Eye by a report they had seen in a Hong Kong newspaper 13 years before, about a 16-year-old girl who had received a corneal transplant and committed suicide soon after.

Oxide said in an interview: "We'd always wondered what the girl saw when she regained her eyesight finally and what actually made her want to end her life".

At the end, the scene with the accident, is based on an actual event from Bangkok gas explosion on New Petchburi Road on 24 September 1990. It killed 88 people, injured 36 people, 67 cars were destroyed and total damage was 215 million baht.

Release
The Eye was released in Hong Kong on 9 May 2002 and in Singapore on 27 June. In the Philippines, the film was released on 5 February 2003.

Critical reception
The review aggregation website Rotten Tomatoes offers an approval rating of 64% based on 104 reviews, with an average rating of 6.1/10. The site's critical consensus reads: "Conventional ghost tale with a few genuine scares". The film has a score of  66 out of 100 on Metacritic based on 26 critics, indicating "generally favorable reviews".

Box office

The film was released in the United States and Canada in 13 cinemas on 6 June 2003, grossing $122,590 its opening weekend. In those countries, the film's widest release was 23 theatres and it eventually grossed a total $512,049.

See also
 List of ghost films
 Adhu
 Kokila, a 1990 Telugu movie with similar plot

References

External links
  
 
 Hong Kong Cinemagic – The Eye
 
 
 
 

2002 films
2002 horror films
2002 psychological thriller films
2000s Cantonese-language films
Films about blind people
Films about organ transplantation
Hong Kong ghost films
Hong Kong supernatural horror films
Hong Kong psychological horror films
Singaporean supernatural horror films
2000s Hong Kong films